St. Bernard's High School is a private Catholic high school in Fitchburg, Massachusetts.

History
Founded in 1920 to educate young women, the need for a Catholic high school in the Fitchburg area was recognized by Bishop Thomas Daniel Beaven, and then materialized during the pastorate of Monsignor James J. Donnelly. The religious institute, founded by Nano Nagle, called the Presentation Sisters were tasked with beginning the school.

In 1925, Donnelly purchased the Page Estate in Fitchburg, which became a convent for the Sisters, and in July 1926, construction of a nearby building would become the St. Bernard's High School campus. It opened its doors on September 4, 1927, with eight Sisters assigned as instructors.

In 1946, athletic venues were constructed, beginning with the football field, known as the "Bernardian Bowl." In 1964, a quarter-mile running track was added, as well as an additional building wing containing a cafeteria, chapel, classrooms, laboratories, library, and offices. In 1980, the school's Activity Complex opened to contain a gymnasiums, locker rooms, and offices.

Originally run by the Roman Catholic Diocese of Worcester, St. Bernard's High won a bid to privatize and operate independently with a board of trustees, as of 2020.

Athletics
Home of the Bernardians, both basketball and football teams have enjoyed success in recent years. The basketball team won the 1998 Division II State Championship, defeating Boston Latin School, and five Sectional Championships: 1997, 1998, 2006, 2008, 2009, 2012, and 2013. The football team has won three Division VIII Massachusetts State Football Championship: 1997, 2018, and 2019.

Notable alumni
Jacques Cesaire (did not graduate), professional football player
Stephen DiNatale (1970), politician
Ryan Durand (2004), professional football player
John Legere (1976), businessman
Joseph F. Murphy Jr. (1961), judge
Milt Morin (1961), professional football player
Edmund F. O'Connor (1939), United States Air Force officer
Peg O'Connor (1983), professor

See also
Religious symbolism in U.S. sports team names and mascots

References

External links
Official website

Educational institutions established in 1920
1920 establishments in Massachusetts
Catholic secondary schools in Massachusetts
Schools in Worcester County, Massachusetts